= Hostucan =

Web hosting search and review website

- Company type: Private
- Industry: Webhosting
- Founded: 2012
- Headquarters: Shanghai, China
- Website: www.hostucan.net

Hostucan is an online web hosting search and review website. It is affiliated to its parent company Shanghai Racent Information Tech Co. Ltd.

== Overview ==
The company has a platform where users can search for the web hosting, domain, keyword, SSL solutions and customer reviews.

== History ==
The company was launched a decade ago and was established by Ray Zheng. The website comes along with its Chinese version website Hostucan.cn as well.

In 2012, HostUcan released its Search Engine Ranking tool in beta, with which webmasters could check the keyword ranking of their sites in the major search engines like Google and Bing.

In 2013, Hostucan revamped their website and added new features. They improved the domain search tool, which enables users to find research and buy domain names.

The company also released SSL, Whois and 'Who is hosting this' tool intended for professional webmaster tutorials.

On September 30, 2013, Hostucan co-organized WHD.china2013 with WorldHostingDays in Shanghai, the first non-official hosting event in China.

On May 22, 2014, Hostucan partnered with Ressellerclub and took part in HostingCon in Shanghai.

On November 21, 2014, Hostucan partnered with WorldHostingDays as the local host in Beijing for WHD.china2014.

== Related websites ==
Other websites owned by Racent include Pinnok, Top10InAction and a Chinese website Shangbangla.
